Allen Webster may refer to:

Allen Webster (baseball) (born 1990), baseball pitcher
Allen Webster, editor of magazine House to House Heart to Heart

See also
Alan Webster (disambiguation)